WMCH (1260 AM) is a radio station broadcasting a religious radio format. Licensed to Church Hill, Tennessee, United States, it serves the Tri-Cities Tennessee and Virginia area.  The station is currently owned by Tri-City Radio, LLC.

External links
 official website

MCH